Estanislao del Campo (February 7, 1834 – November 6, 1880) was an Argentine poet. Born in Buenos Aires to a unitarian family—the unitarians were a political party favoring a strong central government rather than a federation, he fought in the battles of Cepeda and Pavón, defending Buenos Aires´s rights.

He is best remembered for his 1866 satirical poem Fausto which describes the impressions of a gaucho who goes to see Charles Gounod's opera Faust, believing the events really to be happening. He also published his Collected Poems in 1870

A street in the San Isidro neighbourhood in Buenos Aires is named after him.

Estanislao Del Campo is also the name of a small cotton-producing town in Formosa Province, Argentina which lies about 135 km from the city of Formosa.  Its total population is 4,055 according to the census of INDEC of 2001. Most of the population are very poor.

Works
Los debates de Mitre (1857)
Carta de Anastasio el Pollo sobre el beneficio de la Sra. La Grúa (1857), 
Fausto, Impresiones del gaucho Anastasio el Pollo en la representación de la Ópera (1866)
Poesías (1870, prologue by José Mármol)

See also

 Argentine literature
 Gaucho literature

External links

 

1834 births
1880 deaths
Argentine male poets
Writers from Buenos Aires
Burials at La Recoleta Cemetery
19th-century Argentine poets
19th-century male writers